was a system of record-keeping using knotted straw at the time of the Ryūkyū Kingdom. In the dialect of the Sakishima Islands it was known as barasan and on Okinawa Island as warazani or warazai. Formerly used in particular in relation to the "head tax", it is still to be found in connection with the annual , to record the amount of miki or sacred sake dedicated.

See also

 Kaidā glyphs
 Naha Tug-of-war
 Quipu

References

Ryukyu Kingdom
Japanese writing system
Knots
Mathematical notation
Recording
Proto-writing

ja:結縄#沖縄